Leucopogon alternifolius is a species of flowering plant in the heath family Ericaceae and is endemic to south of Western Australia. It is a low, sprawling shrub with thin branchlets, egg-shaped leaves with a heart-shaped, stem-clasping base, and white or pale pink flowers arranged in up to twenty groups along the flowering branchlets.

Description
The leaves are usually concave, the base heart-shaped and stem-clasping and the lower surface a paler shade of green.

Taxonomy and naming
Leucopogon alternifolius was first formally described in 1810 by Robert Brown in his Prodromus Florae Novae Hollandiae. The specific epithet (alternifolius) means "alternate-leaved".

Distribution and habitat
This leucopogon mainly grows in heath sometimes woodland, near swamps between Albany and Walole in the Jarrah Forest and Warren biogeographic regions of southern Western Australia.

Conservation status
Leucopogon alternifolius is classified as "Priority Three" by the Government of Western Australia Department of Biodiversity, Conservation and Attractions, meaning that it is poorly known and known from only a few locations but is not under imminent threat.

References

alternifolius
Ericales of Australia
Flora of Western Australia
Plants described in 1810
Taxa named by Robert Brown (botanist, born 1773)